Ben Harris (born 24 April 1989) is an English rugby union player. He also plays for the England national rugby sevens team. His playing position is loosehead prop.

Harris was born in Huddersfield, West Yorkshire, England.

Harris was initially part of Rotherham Titans set-up but he joined Yorkshire Carnegie on loan in 2012–13 season where he quickly established himself in the first team and made 22 appearances in total throughout the campaign and earned a permanent contract. He was one of the stars of the season, earning a number of Man of the Match accolades and carved a reputation as one of the brightest young talents in the RFU Championship.  He was in consistent form once again in 2013–14 season but injury brought his season to an early end after 19 games. He made another 24 appearances in the 2014–15 season.

On 11 March 2015, Harris made his to move to Aviva Premiership side Newcastle Falcons on a two-year deal from the 2015–16 season. Originally Harris signed a short-term deal with Premiership rivals Wasps However, on 22 February 2017, Harris signed a permanent deal to stay with the Coventry-based club.

Wasps entered administration on 17 October 2022 and Harris was made redundant along with all other players and coaching staff.

References

External links
Newcastle Falcons Profile

Rotherham Titans Profile

1989 births
Living people
English rugby union players
Newcastle Falcons players
Rotherham Titans players
Rugby union props
Leeds Tykes players
Rugby union players from Huddersfield